The Taz (Russian: Таз, transliterated Taz; Taz dialect Тазы, transliterated Tǎzī) are a Tungusic and Chinese Mandarin Chinese-speaking people who primarily live in Russia. They formed in the 1890s, from intermarriages between Udege, Nanai and Chinese. The Taz speak Russian and Northeast Mandarin, with loanwords from Udege and Nanai.

According to the Russian Census of 2002, the total Taz population numbered 276. Among these:
 276 spoke Russian
 131 were males (53 urban, 78 rural) and 145 females (57 urban, 88 rural)
 110 were urban (53 males, 57 females) and 166 rural (78 males, 88 females)

In Bashkortostan, four people identified themselves as Taz.

In Khabarovsk Krai, three people identified themselves as Taz – one male and two females, all of them living in urban areas.

In the 2010 Russian census the number of Taz in Russia dropped to 274.

The Taz dialect is Northeastern Mandarin, with minor influence from local Tungusic languages such as Nanai and Udege.
In the 1880s (?), there were a thousand speakers, but today the overwhelming majority of fluent speakers are elderly and Russian is the primary language of the Taz people.

Prior to the entry of Primorye into the Russian Empire, the religious ideas of the Taz were mainly based on beliefs common in Northeast China including Buddhism, Chinese ancestor worship, Manchu folk religion and Shamanism, with elements of local beliefs. After the accession of the Ussuri region to Russia in 1860, the Taz were Christianized and currently, they follow Russian Orthodoxy.

References

Further reading

 

Ethnic groups in Russia
Indigenous small-numbered peoples of the North, Siberia and the Far East
Tungusic peoples
Subgroups of the Han Chinese